IMLP may refer to:

 Information Management Leadership Program, certification by General Electric
 Immediate Records, record label
 Incarcerated Mother's Law Project, Women's Prison Association